Lillian Benson is a film and television editor who currently serves on the board of American Cinema Editors. She is also the first African-American woman to become a member of the honorary society.

Awards and recognition

1990: Emmy nomination, Eyes on the Prize (PBS) 
Currently: Secretary, ACE Board of Directors
•Recipient of the Motion Picture Editors Guild 2017 Fellowship and Service Award

References

External links
 

American film editors
Year of birth missing (living people)
Living people